Real Madrid Juvenil are the under-19 team of Spanish professional football club Real Madrid. They play in the Group V of the División de Honor Juvenil de Fútbol where their main rivals are Atlético Madrid and Rayo Vallecano.

They also participate in the national Copa de Campeones Juvenil and the Copa del Rey Juvenil, qualification for which is dependent on final league group position, and have taken part in the continental UEFA Youth League, winning the competition in 2020.

Juvenil A

Current squad

Season by season (Juvenil A)

Superliga / Liga de Honor sub-19
Seasons with two or more trophies shown in bold

División de Honor Juvenil
Seasons with two or more trophies shown in bold

Honours
International competitions
UEFA Youth League: 1
2019–20

National competitions
 Liga Nacional / Superliga: 12
1976–77, 1977–78, 1978–79, 1979–80, 1981–82, 1982–83, 1984–85, 1985–86, 1986–87, 1987–88, 1989–90, 1992–93
 División de Honor: 13
1995–96, 1996–97, 1997–98, 1999–2000, 2003–04, 2005–06, 2006–07, 2009–10, 2010–11, 2012–13, 2013–14, 2016–17, 2019–20
 Copa de Campeones: 7
1994–95, 1996–97, 1999–2000, 2005–06, 2009–10, 2013–14, 2016–17
 Copa del Rey: 14
1953, 1968, 1969, 1971, 1978, 1981, 1982, 1985, 1988, 1991, 1993, 2013, 2017, 2022

Juvenil B

Current squad

Juvenil C

Current squad

See also
La Fábrica (Real Madrid)
Real Madrid Castilla
Real Madrid C

References

Juvenil A
División de Honor Juvenil de Fútbol
Football academies in Spain
Real Madrid CF
UEFA Youth League teams